David Monreal Ávila (born 22 March 1966) is a Mexican politician affiliated to the National Regeneration Movement. He is the current Governor of Zacatecas. As a member of the Labor Party served as senator of the LXII Legislature of the Mexican Congress representing Zacatecas.  He also served as Municipal President of Fresnillo from 2007 until 2010.

References

External links
 

1966 births
Living people
Politicians from Fresnillo, Zacatecas
Labor Party (Mexico) politicians
Members of the Senate of the Republic (Mexico)
21st-century Mexican politicians
Autonomous University of Zacatecas alumni
Governors of Zacatecas
Morena (political party) politicians
Institutional Revolutionary Party politicians
Party of the Democratic Revolution politicians
Municipal presidents in Zacatecas